Ann-Mari Aasland (7 June 1915 – 8 August 2008) was a Norwegian politician for the Conservative Party.

She served as a deputy representative to the Parliament of Norway from Telemark during the term 1973–1977. In total she met during 5 days of parliamentary session. She was a housewife in Skien.

References

1915 births
2008 deaths
Deputy members of the Storting
Conservative Party (Norway) politicians
Politicians from Skien
Women members of the Storting
20th-century Norwegian women politicians
20th-century Norwegian politicians